Furman v. Georgia, 408 U.S. 238 (1972), was a landmark criminal case in which the United States Supreme Court invalidated all then existing legal constructions for the death penalty in the United States. It was 5–4 decision, with each member of the majority writing a separate opinion. Following Furman, in order to reinstate the death penalty, states had to at least remove arbitrary and discriminatory effects in order to satisfy the Eighth Amendment to the U.S. Constitution.

The decision mandated a degree of consistency in the application of the death penalty. This case resulted in a de facto moratorium of capital punishment throughout the United States, which ended when the case Gregg v. Georgia was decided in 1976 to allow the death penalty.

The Supreme Court consolidated the cases Jackson v. Georgia and Branch v. Texas with the Furman decision, thereby invalidating the death penalty for rape; this ruling was confirmed post-Gregg in Coker v. Georgia. The Court had also intended to include the case of Aikens v. California, but between the time Aikens had been heard in oral argument and a decision was to be issued, the Supreme Court of California decided in California v. Anderson that the death penalty violated the state constitution; Aikens was therefore dismissed as moot, since this decision reduced all death sentences in California to life imprisonment.

Background
In the Furman v. Georgia case, the resident awoke in the middle of the night to find William Henry Furman committing burglary in his house. At trial, in an unsworn statement allowed by Georgia criminal procedure, Furman said that while trying to escape, he tripped and the weapon he was carrying fired accidentally, killing the victim. This contradicted his prior statement to police that he had turned and fired a shot blindly while fleeing. In either event, because the shooting occurred during the commission of a felony, Furman would have been guilty of murder and eligible for the death penalty under then-extant state law, according to the felony murder rule. Furman was tried for murder and was found guilty based largely on his own statement. Although he was sentenced to death, the punishment was never performed.

Jackson v. Georgia, like Furman, was also a death penalty case confirmed by the Supreme Court of Georgia. Unlike Furman, the convicted man in Jackson had instead of killing someone, attempted to commit armed robbery and committed rape in the process of doing so. Branch v. Texas was brought to the Supreme Court of the United States on appeal on certiorari to the Texas Court of Criminal Appeals. Like Jackson, Branch was convicted of rape.

Decision
In a 5–4 decision, the Court's one-paragraph per curiam opinion held that the imposition of the death penalty in these cases constituted cruel and unusual punishment and violated the Constitution. However, the majority could not agree as to a rationale. There was not any signed opinion of the court or any plurality opinion as none of the five justices constituting the majority joined officially with the opinion of any other.

Justices Potter Stewart, Byron White and William O. Douglas expressed similar concerns about the apparent arbitrariness with which death sentences were imposed by the laws existing, often indicating a racial bias against black defendants. Because these opinions were the narrowest, finding only that the death penalty as currently applied was cruel and unusual, they are often considered the controlling majority opinions. Stewart wrote:

Justices William J. Brennan and Thurgood Marshall concluded that the death penalty was in itself "cruel and unusual punishment", and incompatible with the evolving standards of decency of a contemporary society. Marshall commented further on the possibility of wrongful execution, writing:

Dissents

Chief Justice Warren Burger and Justices Harry Blackmun, Lewis F. Powell, and William H. Rehnquist, each appointed by President Richard Nixon, dissented. They argued that a punishment provided in 40 state statutes (at the time) and by the federal government could not be ruled contrary to the so-called "evolving standard of decency". The four also stated that they personally opposed the death penalty, and would vote against it if on the state legislature, but that it was constitutional nonetheless. In his dissent, Burger wrote, "in the 181 years since the enactment of the Eighth Amendment, not a single decision of this Court has cast the slightest shadow of a doubt on the constitutionality of capital punishment.

Aftermath
The Supreme Court's decision marked the first time the Justices vacated a death sentence under the Eighth Amendment's Cruel and Unusual Punishment Clause, resulting in over 630 death sentences being vacated.

The Furman decision caused all death sentences pending at the time to be reduced to life imprisonment. The next day, columnist Barry Schweid wrote that it was "unlikely" that the death penalty could exist anymore in the United States.

The Supreme Court's decision forced states and the U.S. Congress to reconsider their statutes for capital offenses to ensure that the death penalty would not be administered in a capricious or discriminatory manner.

During the next four years, 37 states enacted new death penalty laws intended to overcome the court's concerns about the arbitrary imposition of the death penalty. Several statutes that mandated bifurcated trials, with separate guilt-innocence and sentencing phases, and imposing standards to guide the discretion of juries and judges in imposing capital sentences, were upheld in a series of Supreme Court decisions in 1976, beginning with Gregg v. Georgia. Other statutes enacted in response to Furman, such as Louisiana's (which mandated imposition of the death penalty upon conviction of a certain crime), were invalidated for cases of that same year.

See also
Capital punishment in the United States
List of United States Supreme Court cases, volume 408
Gregg v. Georgia
Baze v. Rees
Glossip v. Gross

References

Further reading

External links

 

Cruel and Unusual Punishment Clause and death penalty case law
Capital punishment in Georgia (U.S. state)
1972 in United States case law
20th-century American trials
Legal history of Georgia (U.S. state)
American Civil Liberties Union litigation
United States Supreme Court cases of the Burger Court
United States Supreme Court cases